The Chung Chi College is one of the constituent colleges of The Chinese University of Hong Kong (CUHK), and one of the three original colleges that joined to form the CUHK in 1963. Founded in 1951 by representatives of Protestant churches in Hong Kong, it was formally incorporated under the Chung Chi College Incorporation Ordinance in 1955.

Among the colleges of CUHK, Chung Chi is the only one with a religious background.

History
Chung Chi College was founded in 1951 by the representatives of Protestant Churches in Hong Kong to meet the need for a local institution of higher learning. The Board of Regents of St. John's University, Shanghai moved to Hong Kong after it was closed by the Communist government and assisted in the founding of Chung Chi College. The college aims to provide further education in accordance with Christian traditions so that its students can develop an appreciation of both Western and Chinese cultures. It was formally incorporated in 1955 under an ordinance of the government.

The college began with borrowed and rented premises, first in the Cathedral Hall and St. Paul's Co-educational College, then at No. 147 Caine Road and in the Bishop Hoare Memorial Building on Lower Albert Road. Expansion was made possible by financial help from church organizations in North America and Britain. Local churches, firms, and private individuals also gave considerable support. In 1956, the college moved to its permanent site in the Ma Liu Shui valley. Between 1959 and 1963, it received the bulk of its funds from the government. In 1963, it was incorporated as one of the three founding colleges of The Chinese University of Hong Kong.

The college has a Chaplain's Office to promote activities which include assemblies, Sunday Service, Campus Christian Fellowship. The  Theology Division (now named Divinity School of Chung Chi College) was established for the training of Christian ministers.

Presidents & Heads

Presidents & Heads of Chung Chi College:

Presidents (1951-1977)

1. Dr. LEE, Ying-Lin  (1951-1954)
2. Dr. LIN, Dao-Yang  (1955-1960)
3. Dr. YUNG, Chi-Tung  (1960-1975)
4. Mr. RAYNE, Robert N. (1975-1976)
5. Prof. TAM, Sheung-Wai (1976-1977)

College Heads (1977-Present)

5. Prof. TAM, Sheung-Wai (1977-1981)
6. Dr. FU, Philip (1981-1988)
7. Prof. TAM, Sheung-Wai (1988-1990)
8. Dr. SHEN, Philip (1990-1994)
9. Prof. LEE, Rance Pui-Leung (1994-2004)
10. Prof. LEUNG, Yuen-Sang (2004-2014)
11. Prof. CHAN, Victor Wai-Kwong (2014-2015)
12. Prof. FONG, Wing-Ping (2016-Present)

Notable alumni
Andrew Chi-Fai CHAN (1977) - Head of Shaw College (2010–present)
Kin-Man CHAN (1983) - associate professor, one of the founders of Occupy Central
Norman Tak-Lam CHAN  (1976)  – chief  executive of the Hong Kong Monetary Authority (2009–present)
Pamela Wong-Shui CHAN (1968) – chief executive of the Hong Kong Consumer Council (1985–2007)
Victor Wai-Kwong CHAN (1983) -  former Head of Chung Chi College (2014-2015)
Yiu-Nam CHAN (1962) - former professor of Chinese Language and Literature
Yuk-Shee CHAN (1975) - former President of Lingnan University (2007-2012) 
Man-Yee CHEUNG (1968) -  former Director of Broadcasting in Hong Kong Government
Paul Kwan CHIEN (1966) - professor of biology at University of San Francisco
King-Fai CHUNG (1957) - performing arts educator; art director
Tin-Lung KO ( 1979) - Director of Chung Ying Theatre Co.
Yvonne Man-Kuen LAU (1990) - former Hong Kong singer 
Yuan-Sheng LIANG (1972) - former Head of Chung Chi College (2004-2014)
Dennis Kee-Pui NG (1988) - Vice-president of The Chinese University of Hong Kong 
Richard Yip-Fat TSANG (1976) - Hong Kong Composer 
Wung-Wai TSO (1964) - chemistry professor
Shing-Tung YAU (1969) – mathematician; 1982 Fields Medal recipient; 2020 Wolf Prize recipient
Cheung Man YEE – former head of Radio Television Hong Kong

Gallery

References

External links

The Chinese University of Hong Kong – Chung Chi College
Official College Facebook Page: Chung Chi College CUHK 崇基學院

Chinese University of Hong Kong
Protestantism in China
Association of Christian Universities and Colleges in Asia
Seminaries and theological colleges in Hong Kong
Protestantism in Hong Kong